Pavoraja alleni, or Allen's skate, is a species of fish in the family Arhynchobatidae. It is native to Australia. It lays egg capsules which have horn-like protections in each corner. As typical of rays, it does not guard its eggs.

Etymology
The fish is named in honor of ichthyologist Gerald R. Allen (b. 1942) of the Western Australia Museum (Perth), who furnished the authors with the specimens.

References

Sources
 

Rajidae
Taxa named by John D. McEachran
Taxa named by Janice D. Fechhelm
Fish described in 1982